Miloš Jojić (born 19 March 1992) is a Serbian professional footballer who plays as an attacking midfielder.

Club career

Early years
Jojić joined the youth system of Partizan in 2003. He made his senior debut with Teleoptik in 2010. On 24 January 2012, together with Miloš Ostojić, Jojić signed his first professional contract with Partizan, on a four-year deal. He eventually stayed on loan at Teleoptik until the end of the 2011–12 season. During his time at Teleoptik, Jojić scored 14 goals in 60 league appearances.

Partizan
On 15 September 2012, Jojić scored on his competitive debut for Partizan in a 5–2 home league win over Hajduk Kula. On 18 May 2013, Jojić scored the winning goal from a free kick in the 90th minute of the Belgrade derby, which sealed the club's sixth consecutive championship title.

Borussia Dortmund
On 31 January 2014, Jojić signed a four-and-a-half-year contract with Borussia Dortmund, for a transfer fee believed to be around €2.5 million. He made his first appearance for the club on 15 February 2014, coming on as a 67th-minute substitute in a home league fixture against Eintracht Frankfurt. After just 17 seconds of action, Jojić scored with his first touch, a tap in after Kevin Großkreutz's shot was parried, to make the score 4–0. This was the fastest goal ever scored by a Bundesliga debutant, though four seconds too slow to be the fastest goal ever scored by a substitute; a record held by Uwe Wassmer.

1. FC Köln
On 5 July 2015, Jojić joined 1. FC Köln for a reported fee of €3 million. On 8 August 2015, he made his competitive debut in a 4–0 win at SV Meppen in the first round of the DFB-Pokal.

Başakşehir
On 10 July 2018, the club announced that Jojić had been sold to the Turkish side İstanbul Başakşehir F.K.

International career
Jojić represented Serbia at the 2011 UEFA Under-19 Championship in Romania, managing to score once in the team's opening game against Turkey. He made his debut for the senior team in a friendly against Japan on 11 October 2013, scoring a goal in the 90th minute of the game. Jojić was also a member of the team that took part at the 2015 UEFA Under-21 Championship in the Czech Republic, being eliminated in the group stage.

Career statistics

Club

International

International goals
Scores and results list Serbia's goal tally first.

Honours
Partizan
 Serbian SuperLiga: 2012–13

Borussia Dortmund
 DFL-Supercup: 2014

Notes

References

External links

 

Living people
1992 births
People from Stara Pazova
Association football midfielders
Serbian footballers
FK Partizan players
FK Teleoptik players
Borussia Dortmund players
1. FC Köln players
İstanbul Başakşehir F.K. players
Wolfsberger AC players
Riga FC players
Serbian SuperLiga players
Bundesliga players
Süper Lig players
Austrian Football Bundesliga players
Expatriate footballers in Germany
Serbia international footballers
Serbia under-21 international footballers
Serbia youth international footballers
Serbian expatriate footballers
Serbian expatriate sportspeople in Germany
Expatriate footballers in Turkey
Serbian expatriate sportspeople in Turkey
Expatriate footballers in Austria
Serbian expatriate sportspeople in Austria
Expatriate footballers in Latvia
Serbian expatriate sportspeople in Latvia